Rock'a'ula is the only studio album by Brazilian rock band Os Cascavelletes, released in 1989 by Odeon Records. Produced by former Barão Vermelho bassist Dé Palmeira, it is considered a seminal work of the Rio Grande do Sul rock scene of the mid-1980s/early 1990s and spawned numerous hits which were very popular at the time of their release and are still remembered to this day, such as "Jessica Rose" (which originally appeared as a live bonus track on the band's 1988 self-titled EP), the infamous "Eu Quis Comer Você", "Lobo da Estepe" (which was inspired by Hermann Hesse's 1927 novel Steppenwolf) and "Nêga Bombom", included in the soundtrack of the 1989–90 Rede Globo telenovela Top Model. It was the band's first release with keyboardist Humberto Petinelli and without original bassist Frank Jorge, who left them the year prior to focus on his other project, Graforreia Xilarmônica.

The album's title is a possible reference to Elvis Presley's 1961 song "Rock-A-Hula Baby".

Track listing

Personnel
 Flávio Basso – vocals, electric guitar
 Nei Van Soria – vocals, electric guitar
 Luciano Albo – bass guitar
 Alexandre "Lord" Barea – drums
 Humberto "Bluesman" Petinelli – keyboards
 Dé Palmeira – production
 Jorge Davidson – art direction

References

1989 debut albums
Os Cascavelletes albums
Odeon Records albums
Obscenity controversies in music